Bognor Regis Town Football Club is an English football club based in Bognor Regis, West Sussex. Nicknamed 'The Rocks',the club is an FA Chartered Standard Community club affiliated to the Sussex County Football Association.

History
Bognor Regis Town F.C. was founded in 1883 and the club became founding members of the West Sussex Football League in 1896, joining the Senior Division. They won the championship of this league for five successive years in the early 1920s, after which they joined the Brighton, Hove & District Football League in 1926. Just one year later, however, they joined the Sussex County League where they were to remain until 1972. The club became Bognor Regis F.C. in 1929 after King George V added the suffix 'Regis' to the seaside resort.

The club won the Sussex County Division One championship in the 1948–49 season. At the end of that season, they added "Town" to their name so as not to be confused with the local rugby club.

At the end of the 1969–70 season they were relegated, but won Division Two at the first attempt. The club won the Division One championship title the following season and were promoted to Division One South of the Southern League. In 1972–73 they reached the first round of the FA Cup for the first time, losing 6–0 at Colchester United. In 1976 Jack Pearce became manager at the age of just 26, and went on to hold the position until 2007.

In 1981 the club were transferred to Division One of the Isthmian League, and were promoted at the end of the 1981–82 season after finishing second. In 1984–85 they reached the first round of the FA Cup again, beating Swansea City 3–1 in a replay after a 1–1 draw at the Vetch Field. In the second round they lost 6–2 at Reading. They reached the second round again the following season, beating Enfield in the first round, before losing 6–1 at Gillingham. They went on to reach the first round again in 1986–87 (losing 1–0 in a replay to Slough Town) and 1987–88 (losing 3–0 at home to Torquay United). In 1988–89 they beat Football League opposition again, defeating Exeter City 2–1, before losing to Cambridge United.

In 1991–92 Bognor finished in the relegation zone, but were reprieved after Dagenham and Redbridge Forest merged. However, the following season they finished bottom of the Premier Division, and were relegated to Division One. In 1995–96 they reached the second round of the FA Cup for a fourth time, before losing 4–0 at Peterborough United.

In 2002–03 they finished second in Division One South, and were promoted back to the Premier Division. After finishing tenth the following year, the club were placed in the newly established Conference South. They were relegated back to the Isthmian League Premier Division at the end of the 2008–09 season, and were relegated again the following season.

Season 2010–11 saw the club compete in the Isthmian League Division One South and they missed out on promotion back to the Premier Division by the tightest of margins. Having finished with a club record total of 96 points, they lost out in the title race to Metropolitan Police on goal difference by just one goal, having led the table by two points, going in to the last fixture. As a result, they found themselves having to participate in the end-of-season play-offs, where they lost at home to Dulwich Hamlet who had finished 31 points behind.

In 2011–12 they again finished second in Division One South.  They won the end-of-season play-offs, defeating Godalming Town in a thrilling semi-final, before beating Dulwich Hamlet 1–0 in the final, and thus gaining promotion to the Premier Division. The 2013–14 season started slowly, with just one point from the opening four matches. However they soon rose up the table, eventually finishing in third place and qualified for the end of season play-offs, although this ended in defeat in the semi-final at home to Lowestoft Town.

The 2015–16 season saw The Rocks miss out on the Premier Division title by one point and then lose in the play-offs to Dulwich Hamlet. They did, however, also enjoy their best ever run in the FA Trophy by reaching the semi-finals. They beat a number of teams from higher divisions along the way, including Bath City, Maidstone United, Altrincham, Sutton United and Torquay United. But hopes of an appearance at Wembley Stadium were dashed when they were defeated in the semi-final by Grimsby Town, losing 1-0 in the first leg at Nyewood Lane, before also losing the second leg 2-1 at Blundell Park (3-1 on aggregate), despite putting up spirited displays in both legs.

Season 2016–17 saw them finish in second place for the second season running, but this time they triumphed in the play-offs, beating Wingate & Finchley F.C. in the semi-final, before victory over old foes Dulwich Hamlet in the final, to win promotion to the National League South for season 2017-18.
However, despite a promising start to life in the Vanarama National League South in 2017–18, they eventually finished bottom of the table and, as a result, returned to the Isthmian Premier for the 2018–19 season.

The club spent much of the 2018–19 season in play-off contention but a dip in form in the last couple of months saw them eventually finish in 14th place. However, there was something to celebrate at the end of the season as they won the Sussex Senior Cup for the first time in 32 years, defeating Burgess Hill Town 2-1 after extra time in the final played at Falmer Stadium, Brighton.

Stadium
The club play at Nyewood Lane, Bognor Regis, PO21 2TY. The ground has a capacity of 4,500, most of which has covered accommodation. The clubhouse end of the ground saw the addition of an unusual 'beach brolly' style terrace cover in 2018, although this was severely damaged and as a result, pulled down due to Storm Ciara in 2020. The summer of 2020 saw the construction of a new 367 seated stand, with the roof at the clubhouse end replaced in October 2020.
The ground's first set of floodlights was bought from Wembley Stadium and fitted onto telegraph poles. In the 1970s the current floodlight pylons were added, with four along each touchline, before two of these were removed on each side in the early 1990s.

On 15 August 2008 a fire destroyed the clubhouse, and was suspected to be arson. Work on a new social club, named 'Seasons', commenced during the summer of 2009 and opened in November the same year.

The playing surface won an award for the best in all three divisions of the Conference in 2008. Season 2010/11 also saw the pitch win an award, this time voted the best in all three divisions of the Isthmian League, in a poll of referees. The club also won an award two seasons running – 2007/08 and 2008/09, for the best canteen, as voted by supporters of rival Conference South clubs.

Current squad

Club management
As of 18 March 2022

Managers
As of 30 March 22. Statistics below are League matches only (Sussex County/Southern/Isthmian/Conference South).

Honours

League Honours
West Sussex League Winners – 1920–21, 1921–22, 1922–23, 1923–24, 1924–25.
West Sussex League Runners-Up – 1897-98.
Sussex County League Div. 1 Winners – 1948–49, 1971–72.
Sussex County League Div. 2 Winners – 1970/71.
Southern League Southern Division Runners-Up – 1980–81.
Isthmian Premier Division Runners-Up – 2015–16 (not promoted), 2016–17 (promoted).
Isthmian Division One Runners-Up – 1981–82.
Isthmian Division One South Runners-Up – 2002–03 (promoted), 2010–11 (not promoted), 2011–12 (promoted)

Cup Honours
FA Trophy Semi-Finalists - 2015–16
FA Cup Second Round Proper - 4 times
FA Cup First Round Proper - 3 times
 Sussex Senior Cup winners – 1954–55, 1955–56, 1979–80, 1980–81, 1981–82, 1982–83, 1983–84, 1986–87, 2018–19.
The Sussex Royal Ulster Rifles Charity Cup
 Winners (1): 1971–72
 Runners Up (1): 1958–59,
Isthmian League Cup winners – 1986–87

Club records
Record victory 24–0 v Littlehampton, West Sussex Senior League, 1913–14
Record defeat 0–19 v Shoreham, West Sussex Senior League, 1906–07
Record attendance 3,642 v Swansea City, FA Cup first round replay, 1984–85
Appearances: Mick Pullen, 967, 1976–96
Goalscorer: Kevin Clements, 216, 1978–89
Best league performance: (Pre-2004) Second in Southern League Southern Division 1980-81 
(Post-2004) Ninth in the Conference South, 2004–05
Best FA Cup performances: Second round, 1984–85, 1985–86, 1988–89, 1995–96. First round, 1972–73, 1986–87, 1987–88.
Best FA Trophy performance: Semi Final, 2015–16
Most points in a season: 96 points in season 2010–2011, in the Isthmian Division One South

Team colours
The club's home strip consists of green and white, of which in the past, combinations have varied including green and white striped shirts, green and white halved shirts, green and white quartered shirts and plain green shirts with white shorts. Following King George V's decision to add the suffix 'Regis' to the town's name in 1929, the club wore a blue and gold strip for a period in the 1930s, before reverting to green and white some time later that decade. Since the mid-1970s, the strip has mostly consisted of white shirts, green shorts and white socks, as is the case in 2022. Like many clubs, away colours have varied over the years, although blue shirts (various shades) were worn from 1998 to 2016. Since season 2016-17, the club have worn a maroon and white strip on their travels when there is a kit clash.

Shirt sponsors and manufacturers

See also

References

External links
Club website

 
Football clubs in England
Football clubs in West Sussex
Association football clubs established in 1883
1883 establishments in England
Bognor Regis
West Sussex Football League
Southern Combination Football League
Southern Football League clubs
Isthmian League
National League (English football) clubs